Uri Shraga Orbach (28 March 1960 – 16 February 2015) was an Israeli Religious Zionist writer, journalist, and politician. He served as a member of the Knesset for the Jewish Home party, and as Minister of Pensioner Affairs.

Biography
Orbach was born in Petah Tikva, Israel. He attended a Hesder yeshiva, and did his national service in Israel Defense Forces in the IDF Armored Corps, where he served as a Staff Sergeant. He later worked as a journalist, producing columns for Yedioth Ahronoth and serving as a co-host for the Army Radio mid-morning show "The Last Word". He also wrote several children's books, including Donkeys on the Roof and Other Stories, and a dictionary of Religious Zionist slang, My Grandfather Was a Rabbi, as well as founding and editing the popular Israeli children's magazines Otiot and Sukariot.

Prior to the 2009 elections, he joined the Jewish Home. Following a split in the party, in which several members left to re-establish the National Union party, he was placed third on the party's list, and entered the Knesset as it won three seats. For the 2013 elections, he was placed sixth on the Jewish Home list, retaining his seat as the party won 12 seats. He was appointed Minister of Pensioner Affairs on 18 March 2013.

Orbach lived in Modi'in-Maccabim-Re'ut with his wife and four children.

In January 2015, he took a leave of absence from politics for health reasons, to battle a chronic hematologic disease. In February 2015, his condition took a turn for the worse, and he died in the Shaare Zedek Medical Center in Jerusalem on 16 February 2015. His seat in the Knesset was taken by Hillel Horowitz.

References

External links

1960 births
2015 deaths
Deaths from blood disease
Israeli children's writers
Israeli columnists
Israeli Jews
Israeli Orthodox Jews
Israeli magazine editors
Government ministers of Israel
Members of the 18th Knesset (2009–2013)
Members of the 19th Knesset (2013–2015)
People from Modi'in-Maccabim-Re'ut
People from Petah Tikva
The Jewish Home politicians